Hannah Porter (née Myers; b. 28 September 1979) is a former female rugby union player. She represented  in fifteens and sevens rugby, and played for Auckland and Otago provincially. She was in the squad that won the 2002 and 2006 Rugby World Cup's.

Porter was a member of the first official New Zealand women's sevens team who competed in the 2000 Hong Kong Sevens. She later captained the Black Ferns sevens at the 2009 Rugby World Cup Sevens in Dubai.

Porter was appointed as the Black Ferns manager at the 2010 Rugby World Cup. In 2017, She was later appointed as their campaign manager at the Rugby World Cup in Ireland.

In September 2022, Porter was confirmed as the Head of Women’s High Performance at New Zealand Rugby.

References

External links
Black Ferns Profile
NZ Rugby Academy Profile

1979 births
Living people
New Zealand women's international rugby union players
New Zealand female rugby union players
Female rugby union players
New Zealand female rugby sevens players
New Zealand women's international rugby sevens players